S.S.C. Napoli finished a creditable fourth in its first season without the club legend Diego Maradona in the squad. With the Argentinian having failed a doping test in the spring 1991, Napoli was facing an uphill battle, but coped remarkably well, actually improving on its fortunes from Maradona's final season with the club.

Squad

Transfers

Competitions

Serie A

League table

Results by round

Matches

Topscorers
 Careca 15
  Gianfranco Zola 11
  Michele Padovano 7
  Laurent Blanc 6
  Andrea Silenzi 4

Coppa Italia

Second round

Round of 16

Statistics

Players statistics

References

Sources
  RSSSF - Italy 1991/92

S.S.C. Napoli seasons
Napoli